XX Tauri (Nova Tauri 1927) was a nova, which appeared in the constellation Taurus in 1927. It was discovered by Arnold Schwassmann and Arno Arthur Wachmann at Hamburg Observatory on an objective prism photographic plate taken on 18 November 1927.  Subsequent examination of pre-discovery photographic plates taken at the Harvard College Observatory showed that the peak brightness, magnitude 5.9, occurred on 1 October 1927, at which point it may have been faintly visible to the naked eye.  By 1988 it had faded below magnitude 19.8.

XX Tauri faded three magnitudes from peak brightness in just 43 days, making it a "fast nova".  Its post eruption light curve shows small amplitude (~0.1  magnitude) variations of timescales of days, hours and minutes, which makes the determination of the orbital period of the binary system comprising the nova difficult.   The orbital period may be 0.136±0.002 days.

In 1984 a small (radius 2.2 arc second) nova remnant surrounding XX Tau was discovered using the Hale Telescope.   The expansion of that remnant has been used to derive a distance estimate of 3500 parsecs.

References

Novae
Taurus (constellation)
1927 in science
Tauri, XX